Guiyuan Temple is a Buddhist temple located on Cuiwei Road in Hanyang District of Wuhan, Hubei, China.

The New Pavilion built in 1922 is the treasury of the temple.

References

1658 establishments in China
Buddhist temples in Hubei
Religious buildings and structures completed in 1658
Religious buildings and structures in Wuhan